Qasr al-Hallabat is an Umayyad desert castle, with the associated bath house of Hammam as-Sarah east of it. The nearby modern town, named after the castle, is part of the Zarqa Governorate of north-western Jordan, north-east of the capital of Amman.

History
The complex of Qasr al-Hallabat is located in Jordan's eastern desert. Originally a Roman structure constructed in the 2nd-3rd century AD to protect the eastern frontiers of the Roman Empire, although there is trace evidence of Nabatean presence at the site. It was one fort of many on the Roman highway, Via Nova Traiana, a route that connected Damascus to Aila (modern-day Aqaba) by way of Petra and Philadelphia (modern-day Amman). 

In the 6th century, the fort was ceded to the Ghassanids as part of the foedus treaty with the Byzantine emperor Justinian. The Ghassanids significantly altered the structure and constructed a monastery.

By the 8th century, the Umayyad caliph Hisham ibn Abd al-Malik ordered the structures to be demolished in order to redevelop this military site and its neighboring territory to become one of the grandest of all Umayyad desert complexes.

Umayyad complex
Guided by the extant plan, Hisham incorporated a mosque (situated 15 meters southeast of the main structure), a complicated water system including five cisterns and a considerably large water reservoir, and a bathhouse. Furthermore, situated to the west of the palace remains an enclosed structure probably used for agricultural purposes such as cultivating olive trees and/or grapevines, of which only a one-layered stone footprint is still standing.

Qasr
The main palace is built of dark and light stone, basalt and limestone, and has a square floor plan with towers at each corner. Grand in stature, the principal structures were further enhanced with decorative mosaics depicting an assortment of animals, detailed frescoes and highly crafted stucco carvings. The site remains to be completely restored.

Mosque
Approximately some 14 meters southeast of the palace stand the remains of the mosque. Small in scale, it measures 10.70 by 11.80 meters and is constructed of layered limestone. Inside, two arching riwaqs divide the mosque into three sections. A rounded molding extends the perimeter of the space at the height of 2.10 meters. Similar to Qusayr 'Amra and Hammam as-Sarah, three barrel vaults support the roof of the structure. Encircling the mosque from the north, west, and east stood a 3.30-meter wide portico.

Of the mosque, three wall sections, including the mihrab in the southern wall, remained intact from the original structure. Recent reconstruction works have added back the collapsed elements.

Gallery

Modern town

The nearby modern town of Qasr Al-Hallabat is a municipality consisting of four villages. The area is inhabited by the Bani Sakhr tribe, especially the Al-Othman family.

See also
 Desert castles
 Jordanian art
 Umayyad architecture

References

External links

A history of the excavation of Qasr al-Hallabat
 Photos of Qasr al-Hallabat, The American Center of Oriental Research (ACOR)
Photos of Qasr al-Hallabat at the Manar al-Athar photo archive

Amra
Hallabat
Populated places in Amman Governorate
Umayyad palaces
Umayyad architecture in Jordan
Tourism in Jordan